Jobe is both a surname and a given name. Notable people with the name include:

Surname
Ann Wynia, née Jobe (born 1943), former member of the Minnesota House of Representatives
Ben Jobe, American former men's college basketball head coach
Brandt Jobe (born 1965), American golfer
Bubacarr Jobe, (born 1994) Gambian football player 
Frank Jobe, American orthopedic surgeon who performed the first "Tommy John surgery"
Georges Jobé (born 1961), five-time FIM motocross world champion from Belgium
Jackson Jobe (born 2002), American baseball player
Josh Jobe (born 1998), American football player
Kari Jobe (born 1981), American Christian singer and songwriter
Maba Jobe (born 1965?), Gambian army officer and politician
Modou Jobe, (born 1988) Gambian footballer
Momodou Lamin Sedat Jobe (born 1944), Foreign Minister of Gambia from 1998 to 2001
Sami Jo (born Jane Annette Jobe in 1947), American country singer

Given name
Jobe Bellingham (born 2005), English footballer
JoBe Cerny, voice and character actor, producer and director, best known as the voice of the Pillsbury Doughboy
Jobe Watson (born 1985), Australian rules footballer
Jobe Wheelhouse (born 1985), Australian footballer

See also
Joby, a given name
Jobe's test, used in medical examinations

Masculine given names